Sweetwater, is a populated place located along the south side of the Gila River, between Sacaton and Casa Blanca, in what is now the Gila River Indian Community in Pinal County, Arizona, United States at an elevation of 1,211 feet (369 m).

History
Sweetwater, was the location of a stage station and the Pima Agency for Arizona Territory in 1879.

References

Gila River
Geography of Pinal County, Arizona
Native American history of Arizona
History of Arizona
Populated places in Pinal County, Arizona
Gila River Indian Community